Gopendra-Raja (r. c. 771-784 CE ) was an Indian king belonging to the Chahamana dynasty that ruled parts of present-day Rajasthan in north-western India. He is also known as Gopendraka.

Gopendra succeeded his brother Chandraraja I as the Chahamana king. According to Prithviraja Vijaya, their father was Vigraharaja I. The later Hammira Mahakavya, however, states that their father was Vigraharaja's ancestor Naradeva.

The Prabandha-Kosha states that Gopendra defeated one Sultan Beg Varisa in a battle. Historian R. B. Singh theorizes that Beg Varisa might have been a subordinate of the Arab general Muhammad bin Qasim.

Gopendra was succeeded by his nephew Durlabharaja I, who was the son of Chandraraja I.

References

Bibliography 

 
 

Chahamanas of Shakambhari
8th-century Indian monarchs